The Diocese of Saginaw is a Latin Church ecclesiastical territory or diocese of the Catholic Church covering eleven counties in Michigan.  It was founded on February 26, 1938; the first bishop was William Francis Murphy.

 the diocese of Saginaw had 113 priests, 19 permanent deacons, 122 religious, 18 pastoral administrator, 261 commissioned lay ministers, and 24 seminarians. There are 26 Catholic schools in the diocese with a total enrollment of 4,033 students in 3 high schools, 1 middle school, and 22 elementary schools. There are 101,000 Catholics (19.3% of the total population of 724,142) in 56 parishes. The Diocese of Saginaw is a suffragan diocese in the ecclesiastical province of the metropolitan Archdiocese of Detroit.

Geography
The Saginaw Diocese is located in Central Michigan and The Thumb and consists of eleven counties, covering . The population is roughly an even split between urban and rural. The three major urban centers are Saginaw, Bay City, and Midland.

History

1700 to 1930 
During the 17th century, present-day Michigan was part of the French colony of New France. The Diocese of Quebec had jurisdiction over the region. In 1763, the Michigan area became part of the British Province of Quebec, forbidden from settlement by American colonists. After the American Revolution, the Michigan region became part of the new United States.  For Catholics, Michigan was now under the jurisdiction of the Archdiocese of Baltimore, which then comprised the entire country.

In 1808, Pope Pius VII erected the Diocese of Bardstown in Kentucky, with jurisdiction over the new Michigan Territory. On June 19, 1821, the pope erected the Diocese of Cincinnati, taking the Michigan Territory from the Diocese of Bardstown.

The writer Alexis de Tocqueville visited Saginaw in 1831. The northernmost point of his travels, Saginaw was considered a wilderness community of about 30 people, compared to Detroit which had 3,000 inhabitants. The Saginaw area contained no parishes at this time.  Pope Gregory XVI formed the Diocese of Detroit on March 8, 1833, covering the entire Michigan Territory. Saginaw remained part of the Diocese of Detroit for the next 104 years.

1930 to 1950 
Pope Pius XI formed the Diocese of Saginaw in 1938 out of 16 Michigan counties that he separated from the Diocese of Grand Rapids and the Archdiocese of Detroit. The pope appointed Monsignor William F. Murphy from the Archdiocese of Detroit as the first bishop of Saginaw. 

The 1938 P.J. Kenedy Official Catholic Directory notes that the new diocese had a Catholic population of 77,705, with 81 parishes, 31 missions, 112 priests, 41 parishes with schools (of which 17 were high schools), two hospitals, a children's home and a residence for working girls.

Murphy purchased an episcopal residence and a chancery office, and appointed officials needed for the administration of the diocese: vicar-general, chancellor, deans of the four districts, secretary, marriage tribunal personnel. Early on the agenda was the formation of a Catholic Charities department, which was initially sponsored by a new League of Catholic Women. He also began a special seminary collection for the education of future priests, as well as a Clergy Benefit society to provide for retired and disabled priests.

For the large migrant and resident Spanish-speaking population, the bishop established the Guadalupe Clinic and the Mexican Apostolate, and for the elderly, the St. Francis Home.

1950 to 1970
On February 7, 1950, Murphy died. Pope Pius XII appointed Auxiliary Bishop Stephen S. Woznicki from the Archdiocese of Detroit as bishop of Saginaw on March 28, 1950.

In these years following World War II, the diocese underwent tremendous growth, with new parishes and missions. In 1956, the Capuchin Fathers agreed to erect Queen of Angels Retreat House to serve lay residents and priests of the area.

In 1956, Woznicki's advisors voted to establish a six-year boarding school for the high school and junior college years of seminarians. The official founding of St. Paul's Seminary took place in 1957, the same year that Reverend James A. Hickey was appointed its rector. In 1961, the seminary opened, but lack of vocations forced it to close in 1970. The building is now the diocesan headquarters and home to Nouvel Catholic Central High School. 

Woznicki died in 1968, and was succeeded by Bishop Francis  Reh, previously rector of the Pontifical North American College in Rome. He was appointed in 1968 by Pope Paul VI.

1970 to 1980 
Reh began to implement changes mandated by the Second Vatican Council in the Saginaw Diocese and established a Clergy Personnel Board to aid him in clergy assignments. A new tenure policy limited priests' assignments to nine years. The former four-deanery division of the diocese was multiplied into 12 vicariates. The time-honored tax quota system for diocesan support (employed by many dioceses) transformed into a Catholic Services Appeal directly to the people for their voluntary contributions. In 1975, Reh renovated and liturgically updated his Cathedral Church of St. Mary. He also established a Diocesan Pastoral Council of lay advisors to himself, as well as an advisory Senate of Priests. A Liturgy office, a Finance Board, Latin American Affairs department, Black Catholic Concerns department, and a Human Services Council were developed.

In 1971, Paul VI formed the new Diocese of Gaylord from the northern part of the Diocese of Saginaw. Although Clare County and Isabella County were added to the Diocese of Saginaw territory, the re-alignment reduced the diocese from 16 to 11 counties.

1980 to 2020
After Reh retired in 1980, Pope John Paul II appointed Kenneth E. Untener, rector of St. John's Provincial Seminary in Plymouth, Michigan, as the fourth bishop of Saginaw. In 1982, Untener initiated a Come Home program at Christmas time to invite alienated Catholics back to the church. He has also worked to re-establish the traditional practices of Lent. In the 1990s, established a commission for women, a diocesan Office for Stewardship and Development, a Catholic Schools Foundation, and a new Center for Ministry which is located next to the diocesan offices. Untener died of leukemia on  March 27, 2004.

In 2004, John Paul II appointed Bishop Robert J. Carlson of the Diocese of Sioux Falls as the fifth bishop of Saginaw. Carlson emphasized vocations, liturgical renewal, and evangelization within the diocese. The number of seminarians increased from four in 2004, to 12 in 2005, and to 19 in 2006. The first permanent deacon in over 25 years was ordained in August 2006, and two men were ordained to the transitional diaconate in November 2006. The diocese has also implemented a series of Saint Andrew dinners to invite young men to an informal meal and discussion on vocations.

In 2006 Carlson promulgated the letter "We Have Come to Worship Him" outlining liturgical directives and norms for the renewal of worship in the diocese. A month later, the Ablaze Youth Conference was held in Standish, Michigan, with several hundred young people in attendance. In 2007 the diocese began an evangelization initiative to reach out to all families in the diocese through the Faith Saginaw magazine, sent a group of 230 people to the March for Life in Washington, D.C., and held a four-day Eucharistic Congress that summer which included the ordination of two men to the priesthood, and five men to the transitional diaconate.

In 2009, Pope Benedict XVI appointed Carlson as archbishop of the Archdiocese of Saint Louis and named Auxiliary Bishop Joseph Cistone, of the Archdiocese of Philadelphia as the sixth Bishop of the Diocese of Saginaw.  Cistone served until his death from lung cancer on October 16, 2018. Pope Francis appointed Bishop Robert Gruss of the Diocese of Rapid City as his replacement.  Cruss is the current bishop of Saginaw.

2020 to present 

Early in 2020, as a result of the COVID-19 outbreak, Bishop Gruss suspended mass throughout the diocese to prevent the spread of the virus. Gruss switched over to broadcasting Mass from the Cathedral of Mary of the Assumption via WNEM TV 5 and other Saginaw news outlets. Later on, Gruss permitted mass to resume across the diocese, but restricted some pew areas to maintain social distancing, disabled the baptismal fonts when not being used for baptisms, and reduced the number of communion stations. Face masks were mandated and hand sanitizer was provided in the churches.

By the summer of 2021, the diocese permitted parishioners who had received COVID-19 vaccination to attend mass without masks.  The baptismal font was restarted and pews were opened up. However, drinking fountains were disabled, mandatory hand sanitizer stations maintained, masks for the non-vaccinated remained, and the suspension of altar servers. In autumn 2021, altar servers were permitted to assist the pastor again, communion stations were returned to their original pre-pandemic settings, minus the serving of the chalices containing the Blood of Christ, and pews still cordoned off were opened up again.

Bishops

Bishops of Saginaw
 William Francis Murphy (1938-1950†)
 Stephen Stanislaus Woznicki (1950-1968, retired †)
 Francis Frederick Reh (1968-1980, retired †)
 Kenneth Edward Untener (1980-2004†)
 Robert James Carlson (2005-2009), appointed Archbishop of Saint Louis
 Joseph Robert Cistone (2009-2018†)
 Robert Dwayne Gruss (2019-)

Former auxiliary bishop of Saginaw
James Aloysius Hickey (1967-1974), appointed Bishop of Cleveland and later Archbishop of Washington (elevated to Cardinal in 1988) †

Other diocesan priests who became bishop
Kenneth Joseph Povish, appointed Bishop of Crookston in 1970 and later Bishop of Lansing 
James A. Hickey, appointed archbishop of the Archdiocese of Washington
Joseph Victor Adamec, appointed Bishop of Diocese of Altoona-Johnstown Diocese.

Coat of arms
The coat of arms for the Diocese of Saginaw shows a cross in red on a silver field. There are four flames which symbolize the tongues of fire of Pentecost. The name "Saginaw" means the "Place of the Sauk," who were known to the first Europeans as "Gens de Feu" (People of the Fire). Also, because the cathedral is dedicated to St. Mary and her Assumption, in the center of the cross is a six-pointed star. In addition to symbolizing that the Virgin Mary is the House of David, the six pointed star is also one of the heraldic attributes used to indicate the Assumption of Mary.

Churches

Religious institutes
The Diocese of Saginaw is home to three Motherhouses: the Franciscan Poor Clare Nuns (Sisters of St. Clare); the Mission Sisters of the Holy Spirit; and the Religious Sisters of Mercy. It also hosts 15 women's religious institutes working in various apostolates: the Bernardine Sisters of St. Francis; Consolata Mission Sisters; Daughters of Charity of St. Vincent de Paul; Dominican Sisters; Felician Sisters; Servants of Jesus; Sisters of Charity; Sisters of Mercy of the Americas; Sisters of Notre Dame de Namur, Sisters of St Joseph of Chambrey; Sisters of St. Joseph; Sisters of the Precious Blood; Sisters, Servants of the Immaculate Heart of Mary; Sisters for Christian Community; and the School Sisters of Notre Dame. Four religious institutes of men are represented in the diocese: the Capuchin Fathers, Franciscan Friars, Society of Jesus (Jesuits), and the Oblates of St. Francis de Sales.

High schools
 All Saints Central High School, Bay City
 Nouvel Catholic Central High School, Saginaw
 Sacred Heart Academy High School, Mt. Pleasant

See also

 Catholic Church by country
 Catholic Church hierarchy
 Historical list of the Catholic bishops of the United States
 List of the Catholic dioceses of the United States
 Lists of patriarchs, archbishops, and bishops

References

External links
 Roman Catholic Diocese of Saginaw Official Site
 Catholic Hierarchy page on Diocese of Saginaw
 Bishops of the Diocese of Saginaw page 
 Diocese of Saginaw Vocations page
 Article about Saginaw Vocations
 Faith Saginaw Magazine website 
 Michigan Knights of Columbus website
 Saginaw Serra Club website 
 Serra International USA Council website

 
Saginaw
Saginaw
Saginaw, Michigan
Christian organizations established in 1938
Saginaw
1939 establishments in Michigan